Princess Zinaida Nikolayevna Yusupova (2 September 1861 – 24 November 1939) was an Imperial Russian noblewoman, the only heiress of Russia's largest private fortune of her time. Famed for her beauty and the lavishness of her hospitality, she was a leading figure in pre-Revolutionary Russian society. In 1882, she married Count Felix Felixovich Sumarokov-Elston, who served briefly as General Governor of Moscow Military District (1914–1915). Zinaida is best known as the mother of Prince Felix Yusupov, the murderer of Rasputin. She escaped revolutionary Russia and spent her remaining years living in exile.

Early life
Princess Zinaida Nikolayevna Yusupova was the only surviving child of Prince Nicholas Borisovich Yusupov (12 October 1827 – 31 July 1891), Marshal of the Imperial Court, and Countess Tatiana Alexandrovna de Ribeaupierre (29 June 1828 – 14 January 1879). Prince Yusupov was a patron of the arts, and first served in the chancery of Tsar Nicholas I. Zinaida's mother, a lady-in-waiting to the Empress Alexandra, was the daughter of Comte Alexandre de Ribeaupierre and his wife Catherine Mikhailovna Potemkina, a niece of Prince Potemkin.

Princess Zinaida's only brother, Prince Boris Nicholaievich Yusupov, died in early childhood. She also had a younger sister, Princess Tatiana Nicholaievna, who died young, in 1888. As the only surviving child of a distinguished, highly placed, and vastly rich couple, Zinaida enjoyed great favor at court. She was the greatest Russian heiress of her day, and the last of her line, the House of Yusupov. The Yusupovs, a family of Tatars origin, were very wealthy, having acquired their vast fortune generations earlier. Their properties included four palaces in St. Petersburg, three palaces in Moscow, 37 estates in different parts of Russia (Kursk, Voronezh and Poltava). They owned more than 100,000 acres (400 km²) of land and their industries included sugarbeet factories, brick plants, saw-mills, textile and cardboard factories, iron-ore mines, flour mills, distilleries and oil fields on the Caspian Sea.

Princess Zinaida was known for being intelligent, hospitable, socially skilled, and beautiful; qualities that would last her late into her life.

Marriage 
 

Prince Nikolai Borisovich Yusupov was hoping that Zinaida would make an illustrious marriage, but at a reception organized to pair her with Alexander of Battenberg, Zinaida met and fell in love with Count Felix Felixovich Sumarokov-Elston (5 October 1856, Saint Petersburg, Russia – 10 June 1928, Rome, Italy), son of Count Felix Nikolaievich Sumarokov-Elston. Felix was a lieutenant in the Horse Guards. They were married on 4 April 1882 in Saint Petersburg, Russia.
Princess Zinaida and her husband had four sons, two of whom survived childhood: Prince Nicholas Felixovich Yusupov (1883–1908) and Prince Felix Felixovich Yusupov (1887–1967). After his father-in-law died, in 1891, Felix was granted special permission by Tsar Alexander III to carry the title Prince Yusupov as well as that of Count Sumarokov-Elston and to pass them both to his and Zinaida's heir. Prince Felix was appointed adjutant to the Grand Duke Sergei Alexandrovich in 1904 and commanded the Cavalry of the Imperial Guards. In 1914 he was appointed Governor General of Moscow, a position he held briefly.

The couple had their own mansion in Liteyny Avenue, where the Institute of Economic Relations, Economics and Law is currently located. She owned the palace at Nevsky Prospect 86 as well.

Socialite
As a leading figure in pre-Revolutionary Russian society, Zinaida was famed for her beauty, elegance and the lavishness of her hospitality. In her book of memoirs, Ladies of the Russian Court, Meriel Buchanan (1886–1959), daughter of the British ambassador at the Russian court, described Princess Zinaida as:
"Delicate in health, easily exhausted, essentially feminine, she was not one of those capable, competent woman, able to run big charitable organizations. She was always ready to give, freely and generously, to anyone who appealed to her, to do what she could to help anyone in distress, to lend her name, her house, her resources for any worthy cause, but she shrank from publicity, from all the complications of executive administration".

Princess Zinaida Yusupova served  as lady-in-waiting to both the Empress Maria Feodorovna and later Empress Alexandra Feodorovna. She was a personal friend to Grand Duchess Elisabeth Feodorovna wife of Grand Duke Sergei Alexandrovich of Russia. In private, she became a severe critic of Empress Alexandra Feodorovna, Grand Duchess Elisabeth's sister. Zinaida's eldest son, Nicholas, age 26, was killed in a duel in 1908, an event which cast a shadow over the rest of her life. In February 1914, Zinaida's younger son, Felix, married Princess Irina Alexandrovna of Russia, Tsar Nicholas II's only niece and a great-granddaughter of King Christian IX. Felix fell from grace for participating in the murder of Grigori Rasputin.

Following the Russian Revolution, she lost her vast wealth. She and her husband moved to Rome living under reduced circumstances. After his death she moved to Paris, where she died in 1939.

Descendancy
Her descendants are as follows:
 Prince Felix Felixovich Yusupov (11 March 1887 – 27 September 1967), Count Sumarakov Elston, who married  Irina Alexandrovna Romanova (21 March 1895 – 30 August 1970), and had one daughter and a son:
Princess Irina Felixovna Yusupova, (21 March 1915, Saint Petersburg, Russia – 30 August 1983, Cormeilles-en-Parisis, France), married Count Nikolai Dmitrievich Sheremetev (28 October 1904, Moscow, Russia – 5 February 1979, Paris, France), son of Count Dmitry Sergeevich Sheremetev and wife Countess Irina Ilarionovna Vorontzova-Dachkova and a descendant of Boris Petrovich Sheremetev; had issue:
Countess Xenia Nikolaevna Sheremeteva (born 1 March 1942, Rome, Italy), married on 20 June 1965 in Athens, Greece, to Ilias Sfiris (born 20 August 1932, Athens, Greece); had issue:
Tatiana Sfiris (born 28 August 1968, Athens, Greece), married in May 1996 in Athens to Alexis Giannakoupoulos (born 1963), divorced, no issue; married Anthony Vamvakidis and has issue:
Marilia Vamvakidis (born 7 July 2004)
Yasmine Xenia Vamvakidis (born 17 May 2006)

The Australian conductor Alexander Briger claims descent from her, though this is unproven. His stated genealogy does not match the actual family relationships.

Jewel collection
As the head of one of the most important noble families in Russia, she also inherited a vast fortune, which meant owning the largest collection of historical jewels in Russia, second only to that of the vaults of the Russian Imperial Family. She was in possession of 21 Tiaras, 255 Brooches, 42 Bracelets, 210 kilos of assorted Objet d'art and hundreds of thousands of loose gems.
Some of the famous gems were: The mid-16th century La Pelegrina pearl, "The Polar Star Diamond" (41.28 carat diamond), The "La Regente Pearl" (fifth largest pearl in the world), The 17th century "Ram’s Head Diamond" (a 17.47-carat diamond), The 17th century "Sultan of Morocco Diamond" (35.67 carats, fourth largest Blue diamond in the world), The 17th century "Diamond Earrings of Marie Antoinette" (two 34.59 carat diamonds), The "Blue Venus Statuette Sapphire" (4-inch-tall sapphire statuette of the goddess Venus atop a large Spinel) and also The 15th century "Ruby Buddha" (70+ carat Ruby statue).

Following her narrow escape during the Russian Revolution, she was forced to leave all her financial assets in Russia: her entire jewel collection was hidden in a secret vault in Moika Palace in hopes that she would retain their use in their return to Russia, however all were found and sold by the Bolsheviks in 1925. During her exile  she took only the major jewels, and those of historical importance, and had them sold to fund her family's life.

Ancestry

Notes

Bibliography 
Buchanan, Meriel. Princess Zenaida Yusopova . Royal Russia. N 4, 2013. .
Papi, Stefano. Jewels of the Romanovs: Family & Court  . Thames & Hudson, 2013. 
Youssoupoff, Prince Felix. Lost Splendor: The Amazing Memoirs of the Man Who Killed Rasputin. Turtle Point Press, 2003. 

1861 births
1939 deaths
Zinaida Nikolaevna Yusupova
Nobility from Saint Petersburg
Emigrants from the Russian Empire to Italy
Emigrants from the Russian Empire to France
White Russian emigrants to Italy
White Russian emigrants to France
Russian princesses
Ladies-in-waiting from the Russian Empire
20th-century Russian women